The Indian Centre for Space Physics (ICSP) is an Indian non-profit research organisation dedicated to carrying out advanced research in astronomy, astrophysics and space science. It is a sister institute of the University of Calcutta and the University of Gour Banga. It is located in the southern part of the city of Kolkata. It is shifting to its new Integrated campus on the Eastern metropolitan bypass 50 meters from Jyotirindra Nandy Metro station behind Metro Cash and Carry. Its Ionospheric and Earthquake Research Centre and optical observatory (IERCOO) where a 24-inch optical telescope (Vashista) has been installed. School and college students regularly carry out sky watching using its 10-inch telescope (Arundhati). The ground floor of the Integrated Campus will have an Astronomy and Space Museum which will be inaugurated very soon.

Branches
There are currently three branches at several places in West Bengal where people working in different fields of astrophysics: Malda (VLF activity), Midnapore (Optical telescopes) and Bolpur (balloon facility). A full fledged 
near-space balloon facility is being constructed near Suri, Birbhum.

Faculties and divisions

ICSP has five major departments working on several branches of astrophysics and related subjects. Optical Astronomy is done at the Sitapur campus where two faculties, namely Dr. Ashish Raj and Dr. Devendra Bisht work. Prof. Sandip Chakrabarti, Dr. Sourav Palit and Engineer Debashish Bhowmick work on the other divisions, namely, Astrobiology and Astrochemistry, High energy Astrophysics, Space Radiation, X-ray laboratories and ionospheric science.

Division on Instrumentation for Space Exploration

Space exploration by means of balloon borne detectors is the main concern of this Division. ICSP has pioneered in this field of low cost exploration of near earth space using light weight payloads on board weather balloons.  ICSP payloads has visited the space more than 115 times and has gathered a multitude of data from extraterrestrial radiation sources, atmospheric radiation data due to cosmic ray interactions and other atmospheric data. These data has provided new understandings about the cosmic radiation sources as well as the radiation effects on the earth atmosphere. It has also been able to identify several X-ray sources.

Astrochemistry and astrobiology

ICSP pioneered is proposing that even the constituents of the DNA molecules may be produced due to star forming region (Chakrabarti & Chakrabarti, 2000). Since then major work was done to compute the reaction cross-sections to produce complex bio-molecules, grain chemistry, gas phase chemistry and fluid dynamics along with chemical evolution

Ionospheric sciences

The main research activities of this department includes study on solar-terrestrial environment including solar disturbances, Earth's magnetosphere, ionosphere, thermosphere, lithosphere, atmosphere etc. Peoples also work on seismo-ionospheric precursors, lithosphere-atmosphere-ionosphere coupling processes, long-term and transient solar activity and ionospheric climatology using both ground and space based VLF receiver. Monitoring of galactic X-ray transients, Soft Gamma ray Repeaters (SGRs) and Gamma Ray Bursts (GRBs) etc. are also active research topic in this department.

High energy astrophysics
This department mainly deals with Black Hole astrophysics. There are two branches of black hole astrophysics: Theoretical and Observational.
In Theoretical work we carry out the computation of the spectra from matter falling on a black hole. In observational science, we use balloon facility to observe X-ray sources.

Activities and collaborations
ICSP is collaborating with several national and international institutions and universities.  It has produced two PhD students of Nepalese origin in collaboration with ICTP (The Abdus Salam International Centre for Theoretical Physics), Italy. Scientist from ICSP has been taking part in the Antarctica expeditions. In the balloon borne science mission, we have sent low cost payloads through balloons 115 times and obtained valuable data. In addition we are in collaboration with several universities.

References

External links
 

Astrophysics institutes
University of Calcutta affiliates
Research institutes in Kolkata
Research institutes in West Bengal
1999 establishments in West Bengal
Research institutes established in 1999